Jacintha Anouchka Weimar (born 11 June 1998) is a Dutch professional footballer who plays as a goalkeeper for Eredivisie club Feyenoord.

Club career
A graduate of CTO Eindhoven, Weimar joined Frauen-Bundesliga club Bayern Munich in June 2016. After spending a season at SC Sand, she moved to newly formed Eredivisie club Feyenoord in July 2021. In April 2022, she signed a two-year contract extension with the club until June 2024.

International career
Weimar is a former Dutch youth international. She was included in the national team squad for the 2018 FIFA U-20 Women's World Cup.

In April 2022, Weimar was called up to the senior team for the first time. Initially named in the stand-by list for UEFA Women's Euro 2022, she was later added to the 23-player main squad following the injury of Sari van Veenendaal.

Personal life
Weimar was born in the Netherlands to a Dutch father and a Surinamese mother. Besides playing for Feyenoord, she is also a social trainer at the Feyenoord Foundation. She is in relationship with her girlfriend Joyce DeReus since 2019.

References

External links
 
Senior national team profile at Onsoranje.nl (in Dutch)
Under-20 national team profile at Onsoranje.nl (in Dutch)
Under-19 national team profile at Onsoranje.nl (in Dutch)
Under-17 national team profile at Onsoranje.nl (in Dutch)
Under-16 national team profile at Onsoranje.nl (in Dutch)

1998 births
Living people
Women's association football goalkeepers
Dutch women's footballers
Netherlands women's international footballers
Frauen-Bundesliga players
Eredivisie (women) players
FC Bayern Munich (women) players
SC Sand players
LGBT association football players
Dutch LGBT sportspeople
Dutch expatriate women's footballers
Dutch expatriate sportspeople in Germany
Expatriate women's footballers in Germany
UEFA Women's Euro 2022 players
20th-century Dutch women
21st-century Dutch women
Footballers from Eindhoven
Feyenoord (women) players
Dutch sportspeople of Surinamese descent